The 2023 EduSport Trophy is the fifth EduSport Trophy organized by the Romanian Skating Organization. It is scheduled to be held from 11–15 January 2023 at Tiriac Arena in Otopeni, Romania. Medals are awarded in the disciplines of men and women in senior, junior and advanced novice levels; while domestic events would also be contested in the trophy.

Entries

Senior level

Junior level

Advanced Novice level

Changes to preliminary assignments

Results

Senior Men

Senior Women

Junior Men

Junior Women

Advanced Novice Men

Advanced Novice Women

Medal table

Senior level

Junior level

Advanced Novice level

Total level

References

Figure skating in Romania